John Cargyll Shaw (September 25, 1845, in St. Ann's Bay – January 23, 1900, in Brooklyn) was an American psychiatrist and neurologist.

He was the son of John Shaw and Christine née Drew. He received his first education from his mother and later attended a boarding school at Walton, Jamaica. At the age of 17 he went to New York and was employed in the drug house on Pine Street. He graduated from the College of Physicians and Surgeons in 1874.

During his career, he held positions of neurologist to the Brooklyn Eye and Ear Hospital and consulting neurologist to St. Catherine's, St. John's, Brooklyn, Kings County, Long Island College and Hudson River State Hospital. He was president of the New York Neurological Society twice.

He was among the first to advocate and apply non-restraint in the insane hospitals of the United States.

Selected writings
The physiological action of hyoscyamine. Journal of nervous and mental disease, vol. ix. Nos. 1 and 2, 1882.
"The Practicability and Value of Non-restraint in Treating the Insane: A Paper Read at Cleveland, Ohio, July 1, 1880, Before the Conference of Charities". Tolman & White, Printers, 1880
 Apoplectiform, Epileptiform, and Hemiparetic Attacks in Locomotor Ataxia (1888)
Essentials of Nervous Diseases and Insanity: Their Symptoms and Treatment (1904)

Bibliography
 
 

1845 births
1900 deaths
American neurologists
American psychiatrists